Drasteria sesquilina is a moth of the family Erebidae. It is found in Turkey, Kyrgyzstan, Turkmenistan, Uzbekistan and Tajikistan.

References

Drasteria
Moths described in 1888
Moths of Asia
Taxa named by Otto Staudinger